The 2019–20 Georgia Tech Yellow Jackets men's basketball team represented the Georgia Institute of Technology during the 2019–20 NCAA Division I men's basketball season. They are led by fourth-year head coach Josh Pastner and play their home games at Hank McCamish Pavilion as members of the Atlantic Coast Conference.

The Yellow Jackets finished the season 17–14 and 11–9 in ACC play.  The team was banned from postseason play, including the conference tournament, due to NCAA rules violations.

Previous season
The Yellow Jackets finished the 2018–19 season 14–18, 6–12 in ACC play to finish in tenth place. They lost in the first round of the ACC tournament to Notre Dame.  They did not receive an invitation to a post-season tournament.

Departures

Incoming transfers

2019 recruiting class

Roster

Schedule and results

Source:

|-
!colspan=9 style=| Exhibition

|-
!colspan=9 style=|Regular season

References

Georgia Tech Yellow Jackets men's basketball seasons
Georgia Tech
2019 in sports in Georgia (U.S. state)
2020 in sports in Georgia (U.S. state)